Mashona may refer to:

 Mashonaland, a region in northern Zimbabwe
 Mashona language, a Bantu language
 Mashona people, a Bantu  ethnic group
 Mashona mole-rat, a species of rodent in the family Bathyergidae
 Mashona Washington, a retired tennis player from the United States
 1467 Mashona, a rare-type carbonaceous asteroid from the outer regions of the asteroid belt
 HMS Mashona (F59), a Tribal-class destroyer of the Royal Navy that saw service in the Second World War

See also 
 Shona (disambiguation)